The Plymouth Gin Distillery in the Barbican, Plymouth, England has been in operation since 1793 and used to be a significant manufacturer of gin in the UK.  Also known as the Black Friars Distillery, it is the only gin distillery in the city. The original building opens on to what is now Southside Street.

History
Local tradition has it that it is located in what was once a Dominican Order monastery, built in 1431, although there is no evidence to support this. It is also said that some of the Pilgrim Fathers may have stayed here while the Mayflower was in the harbour for repairs before finally setting sail to North America. This is where the ship on the company label is thought to have originated from.

It was a large merchant's house dating from around 1500. By 1605 the building was used as a gaol, and a Congregational meeting house from 1689 to 1705. It was remodelled and extended as a gin distillery from 1793 when Coates joined with the established business of Fox & Williamson. The business was known as Coates & Co. until March 2004.

Present day
It is now a bar with bistro above, and the distillery provides several tours. Since 2005 the brand and premises have been owned by the Scandinavian V&S Group, better known for making Absolut Vodka, who in turn were later acquired by Pernod-Ricard.

Plymouth Gin is still made here, and in recent years there has been an increase in the popularity of the distinctive sweeter and lighter but stronger Plymouth flavour, compared to the more usual London Dry Gin. The company has produced a large range of promotional items, including Dartmouth Potteries Gurgle Jugs, miniatures, glasses, ashtrays, match strikers, etc. Many of these have become very collectable.

On the afternoon of 27 February 2008, the building was substantially damaged by a kitchen fire starting in the nearby (and that time recently opened) Barbican Kitchen, which has subsequently re-opened.

References

External links
 Plymouth Gin
 Plymouth Gin Collectables

1793 establishments in England
Companies based in Plymouth, Devon
British companies established in 1793
Distilleries in England
Pernod Ricard brands
Food and drink companies established in 1793
Industrial archaeological sites in Devon
Grade II* listed buildings in Devon
Buildings and structures in Plymouth, Devon
Grade II* listed industrial buildings